Troy Slattery (born 6 August 1973) is a former professional rugby league footballer who played in the 1990s and 2000s.

References

1973 births
Huddersfield Giants players
Living people
Place of birth missing (living people)
Rugby league five-eighths
Rugby league hookers
Rugby league locks
Rugby league props
Rugby league second-rows
South Sydney Rabbitohs players
Wakefield Trinity players
Australian rugby league players